Wesseling and its variant Wesselink are Dutch toponymic surname. There were great number of farms named Wesseling or Wesselink in the east of the Netherlands, reflecting that they once belonged to a person named Wessel. There also is a town named Wesseling in Germany. People with this surname or its variants include:

Wesseling 
 Gerard Wesseling (born 1939), Dutch road cyclist
 Henk Wesseling (born 1937), Dutch historian
 Maria Riccarda Wesseling (born 1969), Swiss-Dutch operatic mezzo-soprano
 Petrus Wesseling (1692–1764), German-born Dutch philologist and University President
 (born 1942), Dutch engineer and mathematician
 Roy Wesseling (born 1964), Dutch football manager

Wesselink 
 Adriaan Wesselink (1909–1995), Dutch astronomer
 Filemon Wesselink (born 1979), Dutch reporter and television presenter
 Marloes Wesselink (born 1987), Dutch beach volleyball player

See also 
 Asteroid 1945 Wesselink, named after Adriaan Wesselink
 Hermann Wesselink College, secondary school in Amstelveen named after its first principal

References

Dutch-language surnames
Dutch toponymic surnames

nl:Wesseling (doorverwijspagina)